V957 Scorpii is a variable star in the constellation of Scorpius.  It is a blue straggler in the open cluster Messier 7, a star that is unexpectedly hot compared to other members of the cluster.

Spectrum 

V957 Scorpii shows a peculiar B5 or B6 spectrum.  Its luminosity class has been given as main sequence (V), subgiant (IV), giant (III), and supergiant (Ib).  From its position in the H-R diagram, it is actually thought to be a main sequence star.  With a helium abundance 25 times lower than that of the sun, it is classified as helium-weak.  It also has a low carbon abundance and a strong magnetic field.

Messier 7 

Messier 7 is a naked-eye open cluster.  Except for one obvious orange giant star, its brightest members are mostly early A and late B main sequence stars and giants.  Several of them are also chemically peculiar stars.  However, two stars are hotter than the others and lie to the left of the isochrone for the cluster.  These are the blue stragglers HD 162586 and V957 Scorpii.  V957 Scorpii is considered 92% likely to be a member of M7.  M7 has an age around 220 million years, but the apparent age of V957 Scorpii is less than 100 million years.

Variability 
V957 Scorpii varies in brightness by about 0.05 magnitudes.  This is thought to be due to its rotation and variations in its surface brightness.  It is classified as an SX Arietis variable, also known as helium variables.  Their spectral lines also vary as the stars rotate.

References 

B-type giants
SX Arietis variables
Scorpius (constellation)
162374
Scorpii, V957
087460
Durchmusterung objects
6647